The 2019–20 Coupe de France preliminary rounds, Centre-Val de Loire was the qualifying competition to decide which teams from the leagues of the Centre-Val de Loire region of France took part in the main competition from the seventh round.

A total of five teams qualified from the Centre-Val de Loire preliminary rounds. In 2018–19, Saint-Pryvé Saint-Hilaire FC progressed furthest in the main competition, reaching the round of 32 before losing to Stade Rennais.

Schedule
The first two rounds of qualifying took place on the weekends of 25 August and 1 September 2019. 225 teams entered in these rounds, from tier 6 (Regional division 1) and below. 11 teams were exempted to the second round, meaning 107 ties in the first round and 59 ties in the second round.

The third round draw was made on 5 September 2019, with the 11 Championnat National 3 clubs entering, resulting in 35 ties.

The fourth round draw was made on 19 September 2019, with the 5 Championnat National 2 clubs entering, resulting in 20 ties.

The fifth round draw was made on 3 October 2019. The sixth round draw was made on 15 October 2019.

First round
These matches were played on 24 and 25 August 2019.

Second round
These matches were played on 1 September 2019.

Third round
These matches were played on 14 and 15 September 2019.

Fourth round
These matches were played on 28 and 29 September 2019.

Fifth round
These matches were played on 12 and 13 October 2019.

Sixth round
These matches were played on 26 and 27 October 2019.

References

Preliminary rounds